The powerlifting events at the 2009 World Games in Kaohsiung was played between 25 and 26 July. 79 athletes, from 21 nations, participated in the tournament. The powerlifting competition took place at National Sun Yat-sen University.

Participating nations

Medal table

Events

Men's events

Women's events

References

External links
 International Powerlifting Federation
 Powerlifting on IWGA website
 Results
 Entries

 
2009 World Games
2009